Chistoperevoloka is a rural locality (a village) in Levinskoye Rural Settlement, Bolshesosnovsky District, Perm Krai, Russia. The population was 14 as of 2010. There are 2 streets.

Geography 
Chistoperevoloka is located 22 km southeast of Bolshaya Sosnova (the district's administrative centre) by road. Medvedevo is the nearest rural locality.

References 

Rural localities in Bolshesosnovsky District